

History

The Kitchener–Waterloo Braves were founded in 1967. 2017 marked their 50th anniversary of continuous operation. In 2020 the lacrosse team now is recognized as the KW Jr A Lacrosse CLub

Season-by-season results
Note: GP = Games played, W = Wins, L = Losses, T = Ties, Pts = Points, GF = Goals for, GA = Goals against

External links
Braves Webpage
The Bible of Lacrosse
Unofficial OLA Page

Ontario Lacrosse Association teams
Sport in Kitchener, Ontario